Epsom is a town in Merrimack County, New Hampshire, United States. The population was 4,834 at the 2020 census.

History
Incorporated in 1727, Epsom takes its name from Epsom in Surrey, England. Although dotted with several small mountains, the land was suitable for grazing and growing grain. By 1859, when the town's population was 1,366, it had two gristmills and two sawmills.

Geography
The town is drained by the Suncook River and its tributary, the Little Suncook River. Epsom lies fully within the Merrimack River watershed. Other neighboring small mountains in town include McCoy Mountain and Nats Mountain.

Adjacent municipalities 
 Pittsfield (north)
 Northwood (northeast)
 Deerfield (east)
 Allenstown (south)
 Pembroke (southwest)
 Chichester (west)

Demographics

As of the census of 2000, there were 4,021 people, 1,491 households, and 1,103 families residing in the town.  The population density was 117.7 people per square mile (45.4/km2).  There were 1,592 housing units at an average density of 46.6 per square mile (18.0/km2).  The racial makeup of the town was 98.63% White, 0.10% African American, 0.10% Native American, 0.32% Asian, 0.10% from other races, and 0.75% from two or more races. Hispanic or Latino of any race were 0.45% of the population.

There were 1,491 households, out of which 34.2% had children under the age of 18 living with them, 64.0% were married couples living together, 6.9% had a female householder with no husband present, and 26.0% were non-families. 19.7% of all households were made up of individuals, and 7.4% had someone living alone who was 65 years of age or older.  The average household size was 2.62 and the average family size was 3.01.

In the town, the population was spread out, with 24.5% under the age of 18, 5.3% from 18 to 24, 30.9% from 25 to 44, 25.4% from 45 to 64, and 14.0% who were 65 years of age or older.  The median age was 39 years. For every 100 females, there were 92.1 males.  For every 100 females age 18 and over, there were 89.8 males.

The median income for a household in the town was $50,685, and the median income for a family was $56,875. Males had a median income of $40,995 versus $27,106 for females. The per capita income for the town was $22,026.  About 1.9% of families and 3.1% of the population were below the poverty line, including 3.4% of those under age 18 and 3.2% of those age 65 or over.

Transportation
Three New Hampshire state routes and two U.S. routes cross Epsom.

NH 9, U.S. Route 4, and U.S. Route 202 run concurrently through town, connecting Chichester in the west to Northwood in the east. It is known locally as Dover Road.
NH 28 crosses the western side of town, roughly paralleling the Suncook River, connecting Pembroke to Chichester along Suncook Valley Road.
NH 107 enters from Deerfield at the eastern edge of town in the vicinity of Northwood Lake, and joins NH 9, US 4, and US 202 to form a four-way concurrency before entering Northwood. It follows North Road before joining the other routes.

Notable people 

 John Dolbeer (1827–1902), inventor, entrepreneur
 Noah Martin (1801–1863), doctor; 30th governor of New Hampshire
 Andrew McClary (1730–1775), highest-ranking officer to fall in the Battle of Bunker Hill; Fort McClary in Kittery, Maine, is named in his honor
 John B. Sanborn (1826–1904), lawyer and Civil War-era brigadier general; state representative in Minnesota
 Walter Henry Sanborn (1845–1928), U.S. federal judge

In popular culture
Epsom was the town where Leo Rockway (known initially as "Joe") in Stephen King's The Stand was from.

References

External links
 
 Epsom Public Library
 Epsom Historical Association
 New Hampshire Economic and Labor Market Information Bureau Profile

 
Towns in Merrimack County, New Hampshire
Towns in New Hampshire